Demodera is a town in the central highlands of Sri Lanka, located in the Badulla District of Uva Province. 

Transport 

It is served by railway station of the Sri Lanka Railways on the Badulla branch.  There is a spiral at this location.  It is easily visible from the Demodara railway station.  This involves a tunnel which actually runs beneath the Demodara railway station.  On the track which exists, the tunnel winds around a mountain, continuously ascending to end up at a higher elevation on what was the mountain under which the tunnel is built.

See also 

 Railway stations in Sri Lanka
 Nine Arch Bridge, Demodara

References

External links 

 Demodara Sri Lanka

Populated places in Uva Province